Municipal elections were held in Bologna on 6–7 and 21–22 June 2009. The centre-left candidate Flavio Delbono was elected mayor at the second round with 60.77% of votes.

Background 
The centre-left primary elections took place on 13 and 14 December 2008. The Vice-President of Emilia-Romagna, Flavio Delbono, received 49.73% of the 24,920 votes cast in the primary; Maurizio Cevenini received 23.29%, Virginio Merola received 21.44% and Andrea Forlani received 5.1%. On 9 January 2009, Delbono announced that he would be resigning as vice-president of Emilia-Romagna and regional assessor in order to focus on his election campaign.

The other candidates were Alfredo Cazzola, former owner of Virtus Bologna and Bologna F.C., who was the candidate of The People of Freedom and Northern League, and Giorgio Guazzaloca, a former mayor of Bologna.

Voting system 
The voting system is used for all mayoral elections in Italy, in the city with a population higher than 15,000 inhabitants. Under this system voters express a direct choice for the mayor or an indirect choice voting for the party of the candidate's coalition. If no candidate receives 50% of votes, the top two candidates go to a second round after two weeks. This gives a result whereby the winning candidate may be able to claim majority support, although it is not guaranteed.

The election of the City Council is based on a direct choice for the candidate with a preference vote: the candidate with the majority of the preferences is elected. The number of the seats for each party is determined proportionally.

Main parties and leaders

Results

References 

2009 elections in Italy
Bologna
Bologna
Elections in Bologna
June 2009 events in Europe